The teams competing in Group 6 of the 2011 UEFA European Under-21 Championships qualifying competition were Bulgaria, Israel, Kazakhstan, Montenegro and Sweden.

Standings

Matches

Goalscorers
As of 3 September, there have been 51 goals scored over 18 games, for an average of 2.83 goals per game.

1 goal

References
UEFA.com

6
2009 in Swedish football
2010 in Swedish football
UEFA
UEFA
UEFA
2009–10 in Bulgarian football
2010–11 in Bulgarian football
Sports competitions in Trelleborg
International sports competitions in Gothenburg
2010s in Gothenburg
International association football competitions hosted by Sweden
International association football competitions hosted by Israel
International association football competitions hosted by Bulgaria
International association football competitions hosted by Montenegro
International association football competitions hosted by Kazakhstan
UEFA
UEFA
UEFA
UEFA